Dana Rural District is a rural district (dehestan) in the Central District of Dana County, Kohgiluyeh and Boyer-Ahmad Province, Iran. At the 2006 census, its population was 4,905, in 1,152 families. The rural district has 20 villages.

References 

Rural Districts of Kohgiluyeh and Boyer-Ahmad Province
Dana County